The Songjiang Square Pagoda or Songjiang Fangta, officially the Xingshengjiao Temple Pagoda, is a Buddhist pagoda in the old town of Songjiang in suburban Shanghai. Originally built in the 11th century, it is the only structure remaining from the Xingshengjiao Temple, and is now enclosed in the Fangta Park.

History
The pagoda was built between 1068 and 1077, when Songjiang was the largest city in the Shanghai region, a prosperous stop on the Grand Canal between Hangzhou and Suzhou. It formed part of Songjiang's Xingshengjiao Temple, originally established in 949 but now completely destroyed. Its Northern Song style has not changed despite renovations under the Ming and Qing and, more recently, in the mid- to late-1970s. In 1974, its first-floor staircase was restored. 

In 1974 or 1975, a brick vault was discovered under the pagoda during renovations. It was the tomb of the 11th-century monk Miaoyuan whose ashes—as was common of other masters during the Northern Song—had been placed within the hollow belly of the enlightened Buddha to serve as an object of veneration. Two elephant teeth and seven relic beads were placed neatly nearby in two silver cases. The Buddha and the silver cases had been stored in a lacquer case, which had been placed in a larger stone one and then stored in an undecorated crypt.

The Square Pagoda is the centerpiece of the modern city's Fangta Park, which was organized in 1980 by Feng Jizhong as one of the first reassertions of the importance of traditional Chinese architecture after the ravages of the Cultural Revolution. It was added to Shanghai's nationally-protected sites (as No.83-5) in 1996 and is now Songjiang's most famous landmark.

See also
 Other Square Pagodas

References

Citations

Bibliography
 .
 . 
 .
 .

External links
 , a photograph of the pagoda in the 1930s
Xingshengjiao Temple Pagoda, Architectura Sinica Site Archive

11th century in China
Pagodas in China
Major National Historical and Cultural Sites in Shanghai